Mount Arab, sometimes known as Arab Mountain, is a  mountain located in the town of Piercefield, New York, in the northern part of the Adirondack Mountain Range. At the summit of this mountain is a large fire tower and a ranger station known as the Arab Mountain Fire Observation Station. Because hiking to the summit of this mountain does not take very long and because it offers excellent views of the surrounding mountains and lakes, it is an extremely popular location for tourists and hikers of the Northern Adirondacks.

Mount Arab is also a small hamlet in the southern part of the town, just outside the hamlet of Conifer.

References

External links
 Mount Arab Preserve Association
 Friends of Mount Arab
 
 
 The Fire Towers of New York

Mountains of St. Lawrence County, New York
Tourist attractions in St. Lawrence County, New York
Mountains of New York (state)